Coldheart may refer to:

 Coldheart (novel), a BBC Books original novel
 Coldheart (comics), an enemy of Spider-Man
 Mia Coldheart, lead singer in Crucified Barbara
 Professor Coldheart, a villain in the Care Bears franchise

See also
 Coldheart Canyon, a 2001 novel by Clive Barker
 Simon the Coldheart, a 1925 novel by Georgette Heyer
 Cold Heart (disambiguation)